Lac La Hache is a recreational and retirement community in the Cariboo region of British Columbia, Canada.  Located on the shore of Lac La Hache alongside British Columbia Highway 97 near the regional centre of 100 Mile House, the community's origins date to the days of the Cariboo Gold Rush and the Cariboo Wagon Road, for which it provided an important roadhouse.  Lac La Hache, or "The Lake of the Axe" as it translates to, was named, during the fur trade era, after the unfortunate incident of a French-Canadian voyageur who lost his axe head while chopping a hole in the ice. It is a town rich in history, as it sits along the Gold Rush Trail.

Prior to colonization, both the Shuswap (Secwepemc) and Chilcotin (Tsilhqot'in) First Nations were active in the area. The Chilcotins referred to the lake as Kumatakwa, Chief or Queen of the waters. The Shuswap built pit houses near the present day municipality of Lac La Hache.

See also
108 Mile Ranch

References

External links
 Website of Lac La Hache, British Columbia

Unincorporated settlements in British Columbia
Geography of the Cariboo
Populated places in the Cariboo Regional District
Designated places in British Columbia